Marianne Kaufmann-Abderhalden (born 1 April 1986) is a retired World Cup alpine ski racer from Switzerland.

Born in Grabs, St. Gallen, she made her World Cup debut in Åre, Sweden, in March 2006. She won the gold medal in the downhill at the 2006 Junior World Ski Championships. Kaufmann-Abderhalden has attained five World Cup podiums, all in downhill. Her first was in March 2010 at Crans Montana and her sole victory came at Val-d'Isère in December 2013. She announced her retirement from competition in March 2015, due to her training and race performances being hampered by severe pain in her right knee.

World Cup results

Season standings

Race podiums
 1 win – (1 DH)
 5 podiums – (5 DH)

World Championship results

Olympic results

References

External links

 
 Marianne Abderhalden World Cup standings at the International Ski Federation
 
 

 Swiss Ski team – official site – 

Living people
1986 births
Sportspeople from St. Gallen (city)
Swiss female alpine skiers
Alpine skiers at the 2014 Winter Olympics
Olympic alpine skiers of Switzerland
21st-century Swiss women